"Sleep Now in the Fire" is a song by American rock band Rage Against the Machine from their 1999 album The Battle of Los Angeles.

At the end of the song, a short sample of Korean artist Uhm Jung-hwa's 1998 song "Poison" can be heard — it was captured from a local Korean radio station broadcast through Morello's amplifier.

Music video 
The music video for the song, which was directed by Michael Moore with cinematography by Welles Hackett, features the band playing in front of the New York Stock Exchange, intercut with scenes from a satire of the popular television game show Who Wants to Be a Millionaire? which is named Who Wants to Be Filthy F#&%ing Rich. Quoted at the end of the song is Republican politician Gary Bauer stating that, "a band called 'The Machine Rages On' — er — 'Rage Against the Machine', that band is anti-family and it's pro-terrorist", following an incident outside of fellow Republican Alan Keyes' 2000 primary campaign town hall event, where Keyes jumped into a mosh pit formed while Rage Against the Machine was playing.

The shoot for the music video on January 26, 2000, caused the doors of the New York Stock Exchange to be closed. The production had attracted several hundred people, according to a representative for the city's Deputy Commissioner for Public Information. New York City's film office does not allow weekday film shoots on Wall Street. Moore had permission to use the steps of Federal Hall National Memorial but did not have a permit to shoot on the sidewalk or the street, nor did he have a loud-noise permit or the proper parking permits. "Michael basically gave us one directorial instruction, 'No matter what happens, don't stop playing'," Tom Morello recalled. When the band left the steps, NYPD apprehended Moore and led him away. Moore yelled to the band, "Take the New York Stock Exchange!" In an interview with the Socialist Worker, Morello said he and scores of others ran into the Stock Exchange. "About two hundred of us got through the first set of doors, but our charge was stopped when the Stock Exchange's titanium riot doors came crashing down." Trading was forced closed sometime between 2:52pm and 3:15pm 

"We decided to shoot this video in the belly of the beast", said Moore, who was detained by police for an hour and threatened with arrest during the shooting of the video, as Moore had a permit to film on the steps of City Hall but not in the surrounding street.

During the 2016 US Election, the video was noted for its inclusion of a shot of a man holding a "Donald J Trump for President" placard, during Trump's first run for president in the 2000 US Election.

Track listing 

Sleep Now in the Fire (EP) (import)
 "Sleep Now in the Fire"
 "Guerrilla Radio" (Live Version)
 "Sleep Now in the Fire" (Live Version)
 "Bulls on Parade" (Live Version)
 "Freedom" (Live Version)

"Sleep Now in the Fire" (single) (import)
 "Sleep Now in the Fire"
 "Bulls on Parade" (Live Version)
 "Freedom" (Live Version)
 "Sleep Now in the Fire" (Live Version)

"Sleep Now in the Fire", Limited Edition Part 1 (UK)
 "Sleep Now in the Fire"
 "Bulls on Parade" (Live Version)
 "Sleep Now in the Fire" (Live Version)
OR
 "Sleep Now in the Fire"
 "Guerrilla Radio" (Live Version)
 "Bulls on Parade" (Live Version)
 "Freedom" (Live Version)
 "Sleep Now in the Fire" (Live Version)

"Sleep Now in the Fire", Limited Edition Part 2 (UK)
 "Sleep Now in the Fire"
 "Guerrilla Radio" (Live Version)
 "Freedom" (Live Version)
 "Sleep Now in the Fire" (Multimedia Video)

 All five live B-sides are taken from The Battle of Mexico City.

Charts

References

External links 
 
 Axis of Justice Tom Morello and Serj Tankian's Activist Website "Axis Of Justice"

1999 singles
Rage Against the Machine songs
Song recordings produced by Brendan O'Brien (record producer)
Music videos directed by Michael Moore
Songs written by Tom Morello
Songs written by Brad Wilk
Songs written by Tim Commerford
Songs written by Zack de la Rocha
1999 songs
Epic Records singles